The following is a list of notable Turkish architects in alphabetical order.

A–M

 Balyan family
 Krikor Amira Balyan (1764–1831)
 Senekerim Balyan (1768–1833)
 Garabet Amira Balyan (1800–1866)
 Nigoğayos Balyan (1826–1856)
 Sarkis Balyan (1835–1899)
 Hagop Balyan (1838–1875)
 Simon Balyan (1848–1894)
 Levon Balyan (1855–1925)
 Ferhan Azman
 Nail Çakırhan (1910–2008)
 Vedat Dalokay (1927–1991)
 Günay Erdem (born 1978)
 Sunay Erdem (born 1971)
 Mualla Eyüboğlu (1919–2009)
 Mimar Kasım (1570–1659)
 Mimar Kemaleddin (1870–1927)
 Hakan Kıran (born 1962)
 Arif Hikmet Koyunoğlu (1888–1982)

N–Z

 Emin Halid Onat (1908–1961)
 Zeki Sayar (1905–2000)
 Hilmi Şenalp (1957–)
 Mimar Sinan (1489–1588)
 Şekip Akalın (1910–1976)
 Vedat Tek (1873–1942)
 Turgut Toydemir (1938–)

See also

 Architecture of Turkey
 List of architects
 List of Turkish people
 Ottoman architecture

References

Turkish
Architects